The Abasgoi or Abasgians (Abasgoi, and , Abaskoi; ; , Abazgebi;  compare Abkhaz Абазаа  "the Abaza people") were one of the ancient tribes inhabiting western region of Abkhazia, who originally inhabited lands north of Apsilae, corresponding to today's Ochamchira District. In 550, during the Lazic War, the Abasgians revolted against the Eastern Roman (Byzantine) Empire and called upon Sasanian assistance. General Bessas however suppressed the Abasgian revolt.

By the 6th century Abasgia shifted to the north and occupied territory between Gumista and Bzyb rivers, while another tribe, the Sanigs, lived to the north of them. In the time of Arrian, they were said to live on the banks of the Abascus or Abasgus river, an otherwise unidentified river flowing into the Euxine.

The Abasgoi are considered the ancestors of modern Abkhaz, Abazin and the Georgian ethnonym ( apxazi) "Abkhaz" is derived from the name «abasgi, abaza». They are mentioned by Pliny the Elder, Strabo and Arrian; the 6th-century Byzantine historian Procopius wrote that they were warlike, worshiped tree deities and provided eunuchs to Justinian's court.

See also
Apsilae

References

Sources
 

Ancient peoples of Georgia (country)
Tribes in Greco-Roman historiography
History of Abkhazia